The Ceiriog Valley is the valley of the River Ceiriog in north-east Wales. Its Welsh name, "Dyffryn Ceiriog", is the name of an electoral ward of Wrexham County Borough. The ward is the largest ward of the county borough by area and forms a strikingly-shaped salient of the county borough between Powys and Denbighshire.

Geography
The valley forms part of the traditional county of Denbighshire, and between 1974 and 1996 was part of the short-lived county of Clwyd. Part of the lower end of the valley extends into Shropshire, England. It is something of a dead end, with the B4500 road terminating at Llanarmon Dyffryn Ceiriog, a village near the head of the valley.

The -long, -gauge Glyn Valley Tramway used to run through some of the valley; it served various quarries and provided a passenger service between Chirk and Glyn Ceiriog.

The valley receives relatively few visitors, despite being only a few miles from the A5 road. It was described by British Prime Minister David Lloyd George as "a little bit of heaven on earth".

Communities
The Ceiriog Valley is divided into three communities: from west to east, Ceiriog Ucha ("Upper Ceiriog"), Llansantffraid Glyn Ceiriog, and Glyntraian. The largest village in the Ceiriog Valley is Glyn Ceiriog (also known as Llansantffraid Glyn Ceiriog). Villages and hamlets in the Ceiriog Valley include:

Ceiriog Ucha

Llanarmon Dyffryn Ceiriog
Tregeiriog

Llansantffraid Glyn Ceiriog

Glyn Ceiriog
Nantyr
Pandy

Glyntraian
Dolywern
Llechrydau
Llwynmawr
Pontfadog

Literary figures
Three notable Welsh poets have connections with the Ceiriog Valley:

 John Hughes (1832–1887) was born on a farm near Llanarmon Dyffryn Ceiriog, and took the middle name Ceiriog and also used it as his bardic name;
 Huw Morus (1622–1709) was born and lived in Pont Y Meibion Farm near Pandy in the Ceiriog Valley; his bardic name was Eos Ceiriog (the Nightingale of Ceiriog); and
 Robert Ellis (Cynddelw) (1812–1875) was a Baptist minister in Glyn Ceiriog from 1838 until 1840.

The Ceiriog Memorial Institute in the village of Glyn Ceiriog was built as a memorial to them all, and contains stained glass windows dedicated to each of their memories.

The Welsh-language novelist Islwyn Ffowc Elis was born in Wrexham, but spent most of his formative childhood years on a hill farm in the Ceiriog Valley.

See also
Chirk
Llangollen

Bibliography
Dewi Parry Jones and Robert Owen Jones, "100 Years in the Valley – Y Glyn a Fu" (1998)
Dewi Parry Jones and Robert Owen Jones, "100 Years in the Valley Volume II – Y Glyn a Fu" (1999)

Further reading
Gordon Emery – Guide to the Maelor Way (1991)

References

Valleys of Wrexham County Borough